Dasylirion durangense, common name "sotol," is a perennial plant in the family Asparagaceae, native to Durango, Chihuahua and Sonora, Mexico. It is closely related to D. wheeleri S. Wats. and considered a variety of that species by some authors. The plant has a large basal rosette of long stiff leaves over 1 m in length, bearing sharp, curved spines along the margins. The flowering stalk can be up to 3 m tall, bearing small wind-pollinated flowers.

Some publications misspell the epithet as "duranguense" or "duranguensis." "Durangense" is correct.

Uses
The indigenous peoples of the Sierra Madre Occidental (Tarahumara, Pima Bajo, and Tepehuan) use the sweet immature flowering stalk to produce a distilled alcoholic beverage, also called sotol. 
They also strip the spines off the margins of the leaves and use the leaves to make baskets, holiday decorations and other items.

References

durangense
Flora of Mexico
Flora of Chihuahua (state)
Flora of Sonora
Flora of Durango
Taxa named by William Trelease